Rollag is an unincorporated community in Parke Township Clay County, Minnesota, United States. The community is located northeast of Barnesville and south of Hawley on Minnesota State Highway 32.

The living museum WMSTR is located in the community.

References

Unincorporated communities in Minnesota
Unincorporated communities in Clay County, Minnesota